Anisoplia is a genus of shining leaf chafers in the family Scarabaeidae.

Species

 Anisoplia agricola (Poda, 1761) 
 Anisoplia andreae Baraud, 1991 
 Anisoplia aprica Erichson, 1847 
 Anisoplia armeniaca Kraatz, 1883 
 Anisoplia austriaca (Herbst, 1783) 
 Anisoplia babylonicaPetrovitz, 1973 
 Anisoplia baetica Erichson, 1847 
 Anisoplia brenskei Reitter, 1889 
 Anisoplia bromicola (Germar, 1817) 
 Anisoplia bulgarica Apfelbeck, 1909 
 Anisoplia bureschi Zacharieva-Stoilova, 1958 
 Anisoplia campicola Ménétriès, 1832 
 Anisoplia depressa Erichson, 1847 
 Anisoplia deserticola Fischer von Waldheim, 1824 
 Anisoplia dispar Erichson, 1847 
 Anisoplia erichsoni Reitter, 1883 
 Anisoplia faldermanni Reitter, 1883 
 Anisoplia ferruginipes Pic, 1901 
 Anisoplia flavipennis Brullé, 1832 
 Anisoplia hebes Reitter, 1903 
 Anisoplia hebrothracica Král, 1996 
 Anisoplia imitatrix Apfelbeck, 1909 
 Anisoplia insolita Baraud, 1991 
 Anisoplia lanuginosa Erichson, 1847 
 Anisoplia lata Erichson, 1847 
 Anisoplia monticola Erichson, 1847 
 Anisoplia noahi Petrovitz, 1973 
 Anisoplia parva Kraatz, 1883 
 Anisoplia phoenissa Zaitev, 1917 
 Anisoplia pubipennis Blanchard, 1850 
 Anisoplia pumila Marseul, 1878 
 Anisoplia remota Reitter, 1889 
 Anisoplia sabatinellii Baraud, 1991 
 Anisoplia signata Faldermann, 1835 
 Anisoplia taocha Zaitzev, 1917 
 Anisoplia tempestiva Erichson, 1847 
 Anisoplia tenebralis Burmeister, 1844 
 Anisoplia thessalica Reitter, 1889 
 Anisoplia tritici Burmeister, 1855 
 Anisoplia villosa (Goeze, 1777) 
 Anisoplia zwickii Fischer von Waldheim, 1824

References 

Scarabaeidae genera